The 2003–04 NBA season was the 63rd season for the Pistons, the 56th in the National Basketball Association, and the 47th in the Detroit area. Despite a solid year the previous season, the Pistons received the second overall pick in the 2003 NBA draft, which they obtained from the Memphis Grizzlies. They selected Darko Miličić as their top pick, but only used him as a reserve as he played limited minutes off the bench; he would later be regarded as one of the most suboptimal picks in the history of the NBA draft. After their first trip to the Conference Finals since 1991, the Pistons hired Larry Brown as head coach. Under Brown, the Pistons were once again a tough defensive team as they went on a 13-game winning streak between December and January. However, after a solid 33–16 start, they struggled in February losing six straight games. At midseason, the team acquired All-Star forward Rasheed Wallace from the Atlanta Hawks after playing just one game for them. With the addition of Wallace, the Pistons won 16 of their final 19 games finishing second in the Central Division with a 54–28 record. Ben Wallace was selected for the 2004 NBA All-Star Game. The Pistons went on to win the NBA Championship for the third time in franchise history, with Miličić being the youngest player to win said championship.

In the first round of the playoffs, the Pistons defeated the Milwaukee Bucks in five games despite losing Game 2 at home. In the semifinals, they faced the New Jersey Nets who swept them in the Eastern Conference Finals in the previous year. The Pistons would win the first two games at home, but the Nets would put up a fight against the Pistons by winning 3 straight games to take a 3–2 series lead, which included a triple overtime win in Game 5 at The Palace. However, with the Pistons facing elimination, the Pistons were digging an early hole in Game 6, but the Pistons were able to erase a 13–2 deficit and never trailed for the remainder of the game as they would refuse to relinquish the lead to the Nets and win Game 6 81–75. In Game 7, the Pistons stingy defense held Jason Kidd to 0 points to defeat the Nets 90–69 to advance to the Eastern Conference Finals, where they defeated the top-seeded Indiana Pacers in a defensive six game series to earn their first appearance in the NBA Finals since 1990. In the Finals, the Pistons would pull off one of the greatest upsets in NBA history by defeating the heavily favored Los Angeles Lakers four games to one, winning their third overall championship and first since 1990. Chauncey Billups was named Finals MVP.

Draft picks

Roster

Regular season

Season standings

Record vs. opponents

Game log

|-style="background:#fcc;"
| 1
| October 29
| Indiana
| 
| Wallace, Prince (16)
| Ben Wallace (17)
| Chauncey Billups (7)
| The Palace of Auburn Hills22,076
| 0–1
|-style="background:#cfc;"
| 2
| October 31
| @ Miami
| 
| Chauncey Billups (27)
| Ben Wallace (15)
| Tayshaun Prince (5)
| American Airlines Arena15,825
| 1–1

|-style="background:#cfc;"
| 3
| November 1
| @ Orlando
| 
| Richard Hamilton (20)
| Ben Wallace (17)
| Chauncey Billups (4)
| TD Waterhouse Centre14,588
| 2–1
|-style="background:#cfc;"
| 4
| November 5
| Boston
| 
| Chauncey Billups (27)
| Ben Wallace (13)
| Chauncey Billups (6)
| The Palace of Auburn Hills17,376
| 3–1
|-style="background:#cfc;"
| 5
| November 7
| Milwaukee
| 
| Chauncey Billups (27)
| Ben Wallace (15)
| Chauncey Billups (7)
| The Palace of Auburn Hills20,204
| 4–1
|-style="background:#cfc;"
| 6
| November 9
| New Jersey
| 
| Richard Hamilton (24)
| Ben Wallace (11)
| Chauncey Billups (7)
| The Palace of Auburn Hills20,664
| 5–1
|-style="background:#fcc;"
| 7
| November 11
| @ Sacramento
| 
| Richard Hamilton (19)
| Mehmet Okur (9)
| Hamilton, Billups (3)
| ARCO Arena17,317
| 5–2
|-style="background:#fcc;"
| 8
| November 12
| @ Golden State
| 
| Chauncey Billups (19)
| Ben Wallace (11)
| Chauncey Billups (12)
| The Arena in Oakland14,382
| 5–3
|-style="background:#fcc;"
| 9
| November 14
| @ L.A. Lakers
| 
| Chauncey Billups (29)
| Mehmet Okur (9)
| Billups, Hamilton (5)
| Staples Center18,997
| 5–4
|-style="background:#cfc;"
| 10
| November 15
| @ Phoenix
| 
| Richard Hamilton (27)
| Ben Wallace (16)
| Tayshaun Prince (5)
| America West Arena15,681
| 6–4
|-style="background:#cfc;"
| 11
| November 18
| L.A. Lakers
| 
| Chauncey Billups (25)
| Ben Wallace (15)
| Chauncey Billups (8)
| The Palace of Auburn Hills22,076
| 7–4
|-style="background:#cfc;"
| 12
| November 19
| @ Memphis
| 
| Chauncey Billups (33)
| Mehmet Okur (9)
| Tayshaun Prince (6)
| Pyramid Arena13,340
| 8–4
|-style="background:#cfc;"
| 13
| November 21
| New York
| 
| Chauncey Billups (23)
| B. Wallace, Okur (9)
| Chauncey Billups (3)
| The Palace of Auburn Hills22,076
| 9–4
|-style="background:#fcc;"
| 14
| November 23
| New Orleans
| 
| Prince, Hamilton (13)
| Mehmet Okur (18)
| Chauncey Billups (9)
| The Palace of Auburn Hills22,076
| 9–5
|-style="background:#cfc;"
| 15
| November 24
| @ Atlanta
| 
| Chauncey Billups (24)
| Ben Wallace (15)
| Billups, Sura (4)
| Philips Arena18,255
| 10–5
|-style="background:#fcc;"
| 16
| November 26
| @ Philadelphia
| 
| Richard Hamilton (19)
| Ben Wallace (8)
| Richard Hamilton (6)
| Wachovia Center20,512
| 10–6
|-style="background:#cfc;"
| 17
| November 28
| Cleveland
| 
| Richard Hamilton (44)
| Ben Wallace (15)
| Tayshaun Prince (7)
| The Palace of Auburn Hills22,076
| 11–6
|-style="background:#cfc;"
| 18
| November 29
| @ Washington
| 
| Richard Hamilton (25)
| Ben Wallace (11)
| Chauncey Billups (6)
| MCI Center16,853
| 12–6

|-style="background:#cfc;"
| 19
| December 1
| @ New York
| 
| Chauncey Billups (24)
| Ben Wallace (14)
| Richard Hamilton (6)
| Madison Square Garden17,082
| 13–6
|-style="background:#cfc;"
| 20
| December 3
| Miami
| 
| Richard Hamilton (18)
| Ben Wallace (21)
| B. Wallace, Billups, Prince (3)
| The Palace of Auburn Hills17,703
| 14–6
|-style="background:#fcc;"
| 21
| December 6
| @ Houston
| 
| Richard Hamilton (17)
| Ben Wallace (10)
| Chauncey Billups (4)
| Toyota Center18,144
| 14–7
|-style="background:#fcc;"
| 22
| December 9
| Philadelphia
| 
| Chauncey Billups (29)
| Ben Wallace (9)
| Richard Hamilton (5)
| The Palace of Auburn Hills20,166
| 14–8
|-style="background:#fcc;"
| 23
| December 11
| @ Cleveland
| 
| Richard Hamilton (19)
| Ben Wallace (9)
| Richard Hamiton (8)
| Gund Arena15,115
| 14–9
|-style="background:#fcc;"
| 24
| December 12
| Seattle
| 
| Ben Wallace (14)
| Ben Wallace (11)
| Chauncey Billups (6)
| The Palace of Auburn Hills20,244
| 14–10
|-style="background:#cfc;"
| 25
| December 17
| Chicago
| 
| Richaed Hamilton (20)
| Ben Wallace (15)
| Prince, Hamilton, Atkins (5)
| The Palace of Auburn Hills17,041
| 15–10
|-style="background:#fcc;"
| 26
| December 19
| @ Indiana
| 
| Chauncey Billups (13)
| Ben Wallace (11)
| Chauncey Billups (3)
| Conseco Fieldhouse16,383
| 15–11
|-style="background:#cfc;"
| 27
| December 21
| Utah
| 
| Chauncey Billups (19)
| Ben Wallace (13)
| Chauncey Billups (6)
| The Palace of Auburn Hills22,076
| 16–11
|-style="background:#fcc;"
| 28
| December 23
| @ Milwaukee
| 
| Richard Hamilton (17)
| Ben Wallace (20)
| Hamilton, Billups (4)
| Bradley Center15,081
| 16–12
|-style="background:#fcc;"
| 29
| December 26
| New Jersey
| 
| Richard Hamilton (20)
| Ben Wallace (18)
| Ben Wallace (5)
| The Palace of Auburn Hills22,076
| 16–13
|-style="background:#cfc;"
| 30
| December 27
| @ Atlanta
| 
| Richard Hamilton (28)
| Ben Wallace (10)
| Chauncey Billups (4)
| Philips Arena19,445
| 17–13
|-style="background:#cfc;"
| 31
| December 29
| New Orleans
| 
| Chauncey Billups (31)
| Ben Wallace (18)
| Richard Hamilton (7)
| The Palace of Auburn Hills22,076
| 18–13
|-style="background:#cfc;"
| 32
| December 31
| Portland
| 
| Chauncey Billups (22)
| Ben Wallace (15)
| Chauncey Billups (7)
| The Palace of Auburn Hills20,458
| 19–13

|-style="background:#cfc;"
| 33
| January 2
| Phoenix
| 
| Richard Hamilton (26)
| Ben Wallace (22)
| Hamilton, Billups (6)
| The Palace of Auburn Hills22,076
| 20–13
|-style="background:#cfc;"
| 34
| January 3
| Golden State
| 
| Tayshaun Prince (20)
| Tayshaun Prince (9)
| Chauncey Billups (10)
| The Palace of Auburn Hills20,719
| 21–13
|-style="background:#cfc;"
| 35
| January 5
| @ Boston
| 
| Richard Hamilton (15)
| Ben Wallace (16)
| Ben Wallace (5)
| FleetCenter13,015
| 22–13
|-style="background:#cfc;"
| 36
| January 7
| Houston
| 
| Richard Hamilton (16)
| Ben Wallace (15)
| Chauncey Billups (5)
| The Palace of Auburn Hills19,111
| 23–13
|-style="background:#cfc;"
| 37
| January 11
| Dallas
| 
| Chauncey Billups (27)
| Ben Wallace (13)
| Prince, Billups (5)
| The Palace of Auburn Hills22,076
| 24–13
|-style="background:#cfc;"
| 38
| January 13
| @ Chicago
| 
| Richard Hamilton (24)
| Ben Wallace (17)
| Prince, Billups (7)
| United Center17,295
| 25–13
|-style="background:#cfc;"
| 39
| January 14
| Toronto
| 
| Hamilton, Okur (27)
| Mehmet Okur (14)
| Chauncey Billups (6)
| The Palace of Auburn Hills18,473
| 26–13
|-style="background:#cfc;"
| 40
| January 16
| Washington
| 
| Richard Hamilton (17)
| Mehmet Okur (9)
| Chauncey Bullups (10)
| The Palace of Auburn Hills20,539
| 27–13
|-style="background:#cfc;"
| 41
| January 17
| @ Milwaukee
| 
| Chauncey Billups (26)
| Ben Wallace (11)
| Chaucney Billups (6)
| Bradley Center18,717
| 28–13
|-style="background:#cfc;"
| 42
| January 19
| San Antonio
| 
| Chauncey Billups (18)
| Ben Wallace (16)
| Richard Hamilton (6)
| The Palace of Auburn Hills22,076
| 29–13
|-style="background:#fcc;"
| 43
| January 20
| @ Indiana
| 
| Richard Hamilton (15)
| Ben Wallace (10)
| Chucky Atkins (4)
| Conseco Fieldhouse15,848
| 29–14
|-style="background:#fcc;"
| 44
| January 23
| @ Minnesota
| 
| Mehmet Okur (21)
| B. Wallace, Hamilton (10)
| Chucky Atkins (5)
| Target Center19,006
| 29–15
|-style="background:#fcc;"
| 45
| January 25
| Atlanta
| 
| Ben Wallace (14)
| Ben Wallace (15)
| Ben Wallace (5)
| The Palace of Auburn Hills22,076
| 29–16
|-style="background:#cfc;"
| 46
| January 28
| @ Boston
| 
| Billups, Okur (21)
| Ben Wallace (15)
| B. Wallace, Atkins (4)
| FleetCenter14,042
| 30–16
|-style="background:#cfc;"
| 47
| January 30
| @ Toronto
| 
| Richard Hamilton (28)
| Ben Wallace (18)
| Chauncey Billups (4)
| Air Canada Centre19,555
| 31–16
|-style="background:#cfc;"
| 48
| January 31
| Memphis
| 
| Richard Hamilton (20)
| Ben Wallace (13)
| Chauncey Billups (5)
| The Palace of Auburn Hills22,076
| 32–16

|-style="background:#cfc;"
| 49
| February 2
| @ Miami
| 
| Tayshaun Prince (24)
| Ben Wallace (12)
| Richard Hamilton (7)
| American Airlines Arena15,438
| 33–16
|-style="background:#fcc;"
| 50
| February 3
| Cleveland
| 
| Chauncey Billups (19)
| Ben Wallace (17)
| Chauncey Billups (5)
| The Palace of Auburn Hills22,076
| 33–17
|-style="background:#fcc;"
| 51
| February 6
| @ New Orleans
| 
| Ben Wallace (14)
| Ben Wallace (13)
| Richard Hamilton (5)
| New Orleans Arena14,016
| 33–18
|-style="background:#fcc;"
| 52
| February 7
| @ Dallas
| 
| Chauncey Billups (17)
| Ben Wallace (8)
| Richard Hamilton (6)
| American Airlines Center20,357
| 33–19
|-style="background:#fcc;"
| 53
| February 10
| @ New Jersey
| 
| Chauncey Billups (23)
| Ben Wallace (12)
| Chauncey Billups (5)
| Continental Airlines Arena13,781
| 33–20
|-style="background:#fcc;"
| 54
| February 11
| Sacramento
| 
| Richard Hamilton (27)
| Ben Wallace (19)
| Chauncey Billups (7)
| The Palace of Auburn Hills22,076
| 33–21
|- align="center"
|colspan="9" bgcolor="#bbcaff"|All-Star Break
|-style="background:#fcc;"
| 55
| February 17
| @ New York
| 
| Chauncey Billups (26)
| Ben Wallace (13)
| Okur, Sura (3)
| Madison Square Garden19,763
| 33–22
|-style="background:#cfc;"
| 56
| February 18
| Milwaukee
| 
| Richard Hamilton (23)
| Ben Wallace (15)
| Chauncey Billups (7)
| The Palace of Auburn Hills22,076
| 34–22
|-style="background:#fcc;"
| 57
| February 20
| Minnesota
| 
| Richard Hamilton (24)
| Ben Wallace (12)
| Chauncey Billups (11)
| The Palace of Auburn Hills22,076
| 34–23
|-style="background:#fcc;"
| 58
| February 22
| Orlando
| 
| Richard Hamilton (23)
| Ben Wallace (13)
| Chauncey Billups (8)
| The Palace of Auburn Hills22,076
| 34–24
|-style="background:#cfc;"
| 59
| February 23
| @ Philadelphia
| 
| Richard Hamilton (15)
| Ben Wallace (13)
| Chauncey Billups (4)
| Wachovia Center19,972
| 35–24
|-style="background:#cfc;"
| 60
| February 25
| @ Chicago
| 
| Richard Hamilton (21)
| Ben Wallace (8)
| Billips, Hamilton (6)
| United Center19,814
| 36–24
|-style="background:#cfc;"
| 61
| February 27
| Atlanta
| 
| Billups, Hamilton (20)
| Ben Wallace (15)
| Chauncey Billups (8)
| The Palace of Auburn Hills22,076
| 37–24
|-style="background:#cfc;"
| 62
| February 29
| @ L.A. Clippers
| 
| Chauncey Billups (28)
| Ben Wallace (13)
| Chauncey Billups (7)
| Staples Center18,775
| 38–24

|-style="background:#fcc;"
| 63
| March 1
| @ Utah
| 
| Rasheed Wallace (27)
| Ben Wallace (16)
| Billups, Prince (3)
| Delta Center19,911
| 38–25
|-style="background:#cfc;"
| 64
| March 4
| @ Portland
| 
| Chauncey Billups (16)
| Ben Wallace (19)
| Tayshaun Prince (6)
| Rose Garden20,243
| 39–25
|-style="background:#cfc;"
| 65
| March 6
| @ Denver
| 
| Rasheed Wallace (20)
| Rasheed Wallace (10)
| Chauncey Billups (13)
| Pepsi Center19,681
| 40–25
|-style="background:#cfc;"
| 66
| March 7
| @ Seattle
| 
| Rasheed Wallace (18)
| Ben Wallace (13)
| Mike James (6)
| KeyArena14,739
| 41–25
|-style="background:#cfc;"
| 67
| March 10
| Chicago
| 
| Chauncey Billups (19)
| Ben Wallace (9)
| Hamilton, Billups, James (6)
| The Palace of Auburn Hills22,076
| 42–25
|-style="background:#cfc;"
| 68
| March 14
| Philadelphia
| 
| Rasheed Wallace (14)
| Rasheed Wallace (8)
| Chauncey Billups (9)
| The Palace of Auburn Hills22,076
| 43–25
|-style="background:#cfc;"
| 69
| March 18
| @ New Jersey
| 
| Chauncey Billups (20)
| Richard Hamilton (9)
| Chauncey Billups (8)
| Continental Airlines Arena14,799
| 44–25
|-style="background:#cfc;"
| 70
| March 19
| Denver
| 
| R. Wallace, Hamilton (20)
| Ben Wallace (9)
| Chauncey Billups (12)
| The Palace of Auburn Hills22,076
| 45–25
|-style="background:#cfc;"
| 71
| March 21
| @ Cleveland
| 
| Chauncey Billups (18)
| Ben Wallace (10)
| Chauncey Billups (6)
| Gund Arena20,562
| 46–25
|-style="background:#fcc;"
| 72
| March 23
| @ New Orleans
| 
| Richard Hamilton (17)
| Ben Wallace (15)
| Chauncey Billups (7)
| New Orleans Arena14,377
| 46–26
|-style="background:#fcc;"
| 73
| March 25
| @ San Antonio
| 
| Rasheed Wallace (17)
| Rasheed Wallace (14)
| Hamilton, Hunter (5)
| SBC Center17,695
| 46–27
|-style="background:#cfc;"
| 74
| March 27
| New York
| 
| Tayshaun Prince (20)
| Ben Wallace (12)
| Chauncey Billups (13)
| The Palace of Auburn Hills22,076
| 47–27
|-style="background:#cfc;"
| 75
| March 31
| L.A. Clippers
| 
| Richard Hamilton (28)
| Ben Wallace (8)
| Mike James (8)
| The Palace of Auburn Hills22,076
| 48–27

|-style="background:#cfc;"
| 76
| April 2
| Miami
| 
| Chauncey Billups (31)
| Ben Wallace (8)
| Chauncey Billups (7)
| The Palace of Auburn Hills22,076
| 49–27
|-style="background:#cfc;"
| 77
| April 4
| Indiana
| 
| Richard Hamilton (24)
| Ben Wallace (11)
| Chauncey Billups (7)
| The Palace of Auburn Hills22,076
| 50–27
|-style="background:#cfc;"
| 78
| April 6
| Orlando
| 
| Rasheed Wallace (17)
| Rasheed Wallace (11)
| Mike James (9)
| The Palace of Auburn Hills22,076
| 51–27
|-style="background:#cfc;"
| 79
| April 9
| Toronto
| 
| Richard Hamilton (20)
| Ben Wallace (16)
| Lindsey Hunter (6)
| The Palace of Auburn Hills22,076
| 52–27
|-style="background:#cfc;"
| 80
| April 10
| @ Orlando
| 
| Tayshaun Prince (25)
| Williamson, Miličić (6)
| Mike James (8)
| TD Waterhouse Centre15,571
| 53–27
|-style="background:#cfc;"
| 81
| April 12
| Washington
| 
| Richard Hamilton (24)
| Ben Wallace (12)
| Richard Hamilton (12)
| The Palace of Auburn Hills22,076
| 54–27
|-style="background:#fcc;"
| 82
| April 13
| @ Toronto
| 
| Tayshaun Prince (21)
| Ben Wallace (7)
| Richard Hamilton (10)
| Air Canada Centre18,273
| 54–28

Playoffs

|- align="center" bgcolor="#ccffcc"
| 1
| April 18
| Milwaukee
| W 108–82
| Richard Hamilton (21)
| Ben Wallace (14)
| Richard Hamilton (8)
| The Palace of Auburn Hills22,076
| 1–0
|- align="center" bgcolor="#ffcccc"
| 2
| April 21
| Milwaukee
| L 88–92
| Chauncey Billups (20)
| Ben Wallace (12)
| Chauncey Billups (8)
| The Palace of Auburn Hills22,076
| 1–1
|- align="center" bgcolor="#ccffcc"
| 3
| April 24
| @ Milwaukee
| W 95–85
| Chauncey Billups (21)
| Ben Wallace (21)
| Chauncey Billups (7)
| Bradley Center18,717
| 2–1
|- align="center" bgcolor="#ccffcc"
| 4
| April 26
| @ Milwaukee
| W 109–92
| Richard Hamilton (27)
| B. Wallace, R. Wallace (9)
| Chauncey Billups (9)
| Bradley Center17,316
| 3–1
|- align="center" bgcolor="#ccffcc"
| 5
| April 29
| Milwaukee
| W 91–77
| Tayshaun Prince (24)
| Ben Wallace (12)
| Tayshaun Prince (8)
| The Palace of Auburn Hills22,076
| 4–1
|-

|- align="center" bgcolor="#ccffcc"
| 1
| May 3
| New Jersey
| W 78–56
| Hamilton, Prince (15)
| Ben Wallace (11)
| Richard Hamilton (7)
| The Palace of Auburn Hills22,076
| 1–0
|- align="center" bgcolor="#ccffcc"
| 2
| May 7
| New Jersey
| W 95–80
| Billups, Hamilton (28)
| Ben Wallace (11)
| Chauncey Billups (13)
| The Palace of Auburn Hills22,076
| 2–0
|- align="center" bgcolor="#ffcccc"
| 3
| May 9
| @ New Jersey
| L 64–82
| Hamilton, B. Wallace (15)
| Ben Wallace (24)
| Ben Wallace (4)
| Continental Airlines Arena19,000
| 2–1
|- align="center" bgcolor="#ffcccc"
| 4
| May 11
| @ New Jersey
| L 79–94
| Richard Hamilton (30)
| Ben Wallace (15)
| Chauncey Billups (5)
| Continental Airlines Arena19,860
| 2–2
|- align="center" bgcolor="#ffcccc"
| 5
| May 14
| New Jersey
| L 120–127 (3OT)
| Chauncey Billups (31)
| Ben Wallace (11)
| Richard Hamilton (11)
| The Palace of Auburn Hills22,076
| 2–3
|- align="center" bgcolor="#ccffcc"
| 6
| May 16
| @ New Jersey
| W 81–75
| Richard Hamilton (24)
| Ben Wallace (20)
| Richard Hamilton (4)
| Continental Airlines Arena19,968
| 3–3
|- align="center" bgcolor="#ccffcc"
| 7
| May 20
| New Jersey
| W 90–69
| Chauncey Billups (22)
| Ben Wallace (8)
| Chauncey Billups (7)
| The Palace of Auburn Hills22,076
| 4–3
|-

|- align="center" bgcolor="#ffcccc"
| 1
| May 22
| @ Indiana
| L 74–78
| Richard Hamilton (23)
| Ben Wallace (22)
| Ben Wallace (5)
| Conseco Fieldhouse18,345
| 0–1
|- align="center" bgcolor="#ccffcc"
| 2
| May 24
| @ Indiana
| W 72–67
| Richard Hamilton (23)
| three players tied (8)
| Chauncey Billups (6)
| Conseco Fieldhouse18,345
| 1–1
|- align="center" bgcolor="#ccffcc"
| 3
| May 26
| Indiana
| W 85–78
| Hamilton, R. Wallace (20)
| Ben Wallace (16)
| Chauncey Billups (8)
| The Palace of Auburn Hills22,076
| 2–1
|- align="center" bgcolor="#ffcccc"
| 4
| May 28
| Indiana
| L 68–83
| Richard Hamilton (22)
| Ben Wallace (19)
| Chauncey Billups (5)
| The Palace of Auburn Hills22,076
| 2–2
|- align="center" bgcolor="#ccffcc"
| 5
| May 30
| @ Indiana
| W 83–65
| Richard Hamilton (33)
| Ben Wallace (12)
| Chauncey Billups (7)
| Conseco Fieldhouse18,345
| 3–2
|- align="center" bgcolor="#ccffcc"
| 6
| June 1
| Indiana
| W 69–65
| Richard Hamilton (21)
| Ben Wallace (16)
| Richard Hamilton (5)
| The Palace of Auburn Hills22,076
| 4–2
|-

|- align="center" bgcolor="#ccffcc"
| 1
| June 6
| @ L.A. Lakers
| W 87–75
| Chauncey Billups (22)
| B. Wallace, R. Wallace (8)
| Richard Hamilton (5)
| Staples Center18,997
| 1–0
|- align="center" bgcolor="#ffcccc"
| 2
| June 8
| @ L.A. Lakers
| L 91–99 (OT)
| Chauncey Billups (27)
| Ben Wallace (14)
| Chauncey Billups (9)
| Staples Center18,997
| 1–1
|- align="center" bgcolor="#ccffcc"
| 3
| June 10
| L.A. Lakers
| W 88–68
| Richard Hamilton (31)
| Ben Wallace (11)
| three players tied (3)
| The Palace of Auburn Hills22,076
| 2–1
|- align="center" bgcolor="#ccffcc"
| 4
| June 13
| L.A. Lakers
| W 88–80
| Rasheed Wallace (26)
| B. Wallace, R. Wallace (13)
| Richard Hamilton (6)
| The Palace of Auburn Hills22,076
| 3–1
|- align="center" bgcolor="#ccffcc"
| 5
| June 15
| L.A. Lakers
| W 100–87
| Richard Hamilton (21)
| Ben Wallace (22)
| Chauncey Billups (6)
| The Palace of Auburn Hills22,076
| 4–1
|-

NBA Finals

Series summary

(OT) denotes a game that required overtime.

The Finals were played using a 2-3-2 site format, where the first two and last two games are held at the team with home court advantage. This was only used in the Finals, all other playoff series are held in a 2-2-1-1-1 format (the team with home court advantage starts).

Aspects
The Lakers had a lineup of stars such as Karl Malone, Gary Payton,  Derek Fisher, Kobe Bryant, and Shaquille O'Neal – their offensive capability was expected to overpower Detroit's defensive-based gameplan.

Payton and Malone also added to the publicity of the Finals.  Perennial All-Stars who had both previously reached the Finals, Payton had led the Seattle SuperSonics there in 1996, while Malone had led the Utah Jazz there in 1997 and 1998.  However, Michael Jordan and the Bulls denied their championship rings a total of three times. By the time of Jordan's retirement in 2003, the two veterans were aged and failed to lead their teams deep into the playoffs. Thus, this Finals series was seen as the last chance for two of the greatest players in NBA history to finally become NBA champions (Later on, Malone retired while Payton became a champion as a key bench player for the Miami Heat).

Game One
Sunday, June 6, 2004, 14:30 at the Staples Center.

Considered to be a stunning upset by most of the NBA world, the Detroit Pistons managed to defeat the Lakers with imposing defense. Defensively clamping down on everyone but Bryant and O'Neal, the Pistons managed to hold everyone else to a total of 16 points.

The Pistons trailed the Lakers 41–40 at halftime, but a 10–4 surge capped by Billups's 3-pointer gave the Pistons the lead. O'Neal's foul trouble furthered the scoring gap, with the Pistons leading by 13 points early in the fourth quarter.

Game Two
Tuesday, June 8, 2004, 15:04 at the Staples Center.

The second game was close throughout the first half, but in the third quarter Detroit would score 30 points, cutting the deficit 68–66. However, at the end of the fourth quarter, Kobe Bryant's 3-point shot at 2.1 seconds to go would tie the game at 89–89. The Lakers and Pistons would then go to overtime, with the Lakers outscoring the Pistons 10–2.

Game Three
Thursday, June 10, 2004, 14:31 at The Palace of Auburn Hills.

The Pistons beat Los Angeles by 20 in their first NBA Finals appearance together at The Palace of Auburn Hills since 1989 to take a 2–1 lead in the series. The 68 points scored by the Lakers set a (post-shot clock) franchise record for the fewest points scored in a Finals game. (Even Jay Leno was upset, saying in his Tonight Show monologue: "68 points? 68 is a great score...if you're playing golf!")

Game Four
Sunday, June 13, 2004, 14:49 at The Palace of Auburn Hills.

Again, the Pistons defeated the Lakers, although this time by eight, to take a 3–1 series advantage.

Game Five
Tuesday, June 15, 2004, 14:32 at The Palace of Auburn Hills.

In Game 5, the Pistons won their first championship since 1990, and Larry Brown finally won a title as an NBA head coach. The Pistons defense had overcome the high-scoring Laker offense, winning the game by 13, winning the series 4-1, and also ending a long Laker dynasty that lasted for many years.  The game saw the end of Phil Jackson's first run as the coach (he returned for the 2005-06 season), and saw O'Neal, Payton, and Malone's last games in Laker uniforms (O'Neal and Payton were both acquired by the soon-to-be NBA Champions Miami Heat and Malone retired).

Playoff Defensive Records
As a result of their incredible defensive dominance, the 2004 Pistons set a number of notable shot-clock era (1955–Present) defensive Playoff records

 Allowed under 90 points in 18 playoff games 
 Allowed under 85 points in 16 playoff games 
 Allowed under 80 points in 11 playoff games 
 Allowed under 75 points in 6 playoff games 
 Allowed under 70 points in 6 playoff games 
 Allowed 65 or less points in 3 playoff games 
 One of 2 teams (1998 Bulls) to allow under 60 points in a playoff game 
 Allowed under 40% FG in 12 playoff games 
 Allowed under 35% FG in 5 playoff games  (Tied with 1999 Knicks)
 Allowed under 30% FG in 2 playoff games  (Tied with 1999 Knicks)

Least Points Per Game (PPG) allowed in a shot-clock era Playoff run of any length 
 The 2004 Pistons allowed 80.696 PPG, slightly lower than the 2000 Heat at 80.700 PPG allowed 
 Excluding Overtime periods, the 2004 Pistons allowed 78.6 PPG for the Playoffs in regulation compared to 79.9 PPG allowed for the 2000 Heat

The 2004 Pistons had a Defensive Rating of 92.0 in the Playoffs 
 This is the lowest Defensive Rating any team has had in a Post-1st Round Playoff run in the 3-point era (1980–present)
 The 2000 Spurs had a 91.4 Defensive Rating, but this was in a 1st Round loss of only 4 games

Player statistics

Season

* Statistics include only games with the Pistons

Playoffs

Award winners
Chauncey Billups, NBA Finals Most Valuable Player Award
Ben Wallace, All-NBA Second Team
Ben Wallace, NBA All-Defensive First Team

Transactions

Overview

Trades

Free agency

Additions

Subtractions

References

External links
 Detroit Pistons on Database Basketball
 Detroit Pistons on Basketball Reference

Det
Detroit Pistons seasons
Eastern Conference (NBA) championship seasons
NBA championship seasons
Detroit
Detroit